General elections were held in Saint Kitts and Nevis on 18 February 1980. Although the Saint Kitts and Nevis Labour Party won a plurality of the elected seats, the People's Action Movement (PAM) were able to form a coalition government with the Nevis Reformation Party which held a one-seat majority. PAM leader Kennedy Simmonds became Premier. Voter turnout was 74.5%.

Results

References

Saint Kitts
Elections in Saint Kitts and Nevis
General
Saint Christopher-Nevis-Anguilla
Saint Kitts